Miss America 1999, the 72nd Miss America pageant, was held at the Boardwalk Hall in Atlantic City, New Jersey on Saturday, September 19, 1998 on ABC Network.

Results

Placements

Order of announcements

Top 10

Top 5

Awards

Preliminary awards

Non-finalist awards

Quality of Life awards

Delegates

  Alabama - Ashley Halfman
  Alaska - Joslyn Tinker
  Arizona - Leean Hendrix
  Arkansas - Erin Wheatley
  California - Danielle Coney
  Colorado - Keely Gaston	
  Connecticut - Lauren Bergamo
  Delaware - Jody Kelly
  District of Columbia - Nicole Messina
  Florida - Lissette Gonzalez
  Georgia - April Brinson
  Hawaii - Jennifer Hera
  Idaho - Tammy Toney
  Illinois - Amanda Jo Meadows
  Indiana - Julianne Hackney
  Iowa - Lisa Dondlinger
  Kansas - Jennifer Vannatta
  Kentucky - Chera-Lyn Cook
  Louisiana - Heather Dupree
  Maine - Stephany Stanley
  Maryland - Heather Noelle Davis
  Massachusetts - Elizabeth Emerson Hancock
  Michigan -  Laura Frances Welling
  Minnesota - Megan West
  Mississippi - Melinda King
  Missouri - Deborah McDonald
  Montana - Delight Michelle Scheck
  Nebraska -  Jenny Lemmerman
  Nevada - Anna Carpenter
  New Hampshire - Heidi Marie Noyes
  New Jersey - Stephanie Ferrari
  New Mexico - Lindsay Chism
  New York - Deana Herrera
  North Carolina - Kelli Bradshaw
  North Dakota - Sonja Gedde
  Ohio - Cheya Watkins
  Oklahoma - Julie Payne
  Oregon - Jennifer Sisco-Moore
  Pennsylvania - Mayra Acosta
  Rhode Island - Heather Picard
  South Carolina - Wendy Willis 
  South Dakota - Sara Frankenstein
  Tennessee - Heather Heath
  Texas - Tatum Hubbard
  Utah - Michele Mobley
  Vermont - Aimee Rzewuski
  Virginia - Nicole Johnson
  Washington - Marianna Loya 
  West Virginia - Amy Townsend
  Wisconsin - Jill Patzner
  Wyoming - Mindy Baughman

Judges
 Nora McAniff
 Picabo Street
 Stephen Schwartz
 Debbi Morgan
 Nancy O'Dell
 Ian Ziering
 Tawny Little

External links
 Miss America official website

1999
1998 in the United States
1999 beauty pageants
1998 in New Jersey
September 1998 events in the United States
Events in Atlantic City, New Jersey